The Witches of Eastwick is a novel by John Updike.

The Witches of Eastwick may also refer to:

 The Witches of Eastwick (film), a 1987 adaptation of the novel
 The Witches of Eastwick (musical), a 2000 musical based on the novel
 Eastwick (TV series), a 2009 television series based on the novel

See also
 The Widows of Eastwick, a 2008 sequel to the novel written by John Updike